This article shows the rosters of all participating teams at the 2021 Asian Men's Club Volleyball Championship in Nakhon Ratchasima, Thailand.

Pool A

Nakhon Ratchasima
The following is the roster of the Thai club Nakhon Ratchasima VC in the 2021 Asian Club Championship.
Head coach:  Padejsuk Vannachote

CEB
The following is the roster of the Sri Lankan club CEB in the 2021 Asian Club Championship.
Head coach:  Ranasingha Arachchilage Chaminda Kumara Jayarathna

Burevestnik Almaty
The following is the roster of the Kazakh club Burevestnik Almaty in the 2021 Asian Club Championship.
Head coach:  Alexandr Zapevalov

Kazma
The following is the roster of the Kuwaiti club Kazma in the 2021 Asian Club Championship.
Head coach:  Fabiano Preturlon

South Gas
The following is the roster of the Iraqi club South Gas in the 2021 Asian Club Championship.
Head coach:  Alaa Khalaf Abdulsattar

Pool B

Foolad Sirjan
The following is the roster of the Iranian club Foolad Sirjan in the 2021 Asian Club Championship.
Head coach:  Saeid Rezaei

Rebisco
The following is the roster of the Philippines national team competing as Rebisco PH in the 2021 Asian Club Championship.
Head coach:  Dante Alinsunurin Jr.

Al-Arabi
The following is the roster of the Qatari club Al-Arabi in the 2021 Asian Club Championship.
Head coach:  Juan Manuel Cichello

Diamond Food
The following is the roster of the Thai club Diamond Food in the 2021 Asian Club Championship.
Head coach:  Somboon Nakpung

AGMK
The following is the roster of the Uzbek club AGMK in the 2021 Asian Club Championship.
Head coach:  Aziz Teshabaev

References

Asian Men's Club Volleyball Championship